Mark Nicholson may refer to:

 Osymyso, real name Mark Nicholson, British musician and DJ
 Mark Nicholson (politician) (1818–1889), pastoralist and politician in colonial Victoria, Australia
 Mark Nicholson (footballer),English footballer
 Mark Nicholson (Home and Away)

See also
 Mark Nicolson, American tenor opera singer